Frostia is a genus of soldier beetles in the family Cantharidae. There are about five described species in Frostia.

Species
These five species belong to the genus Frostia:
 Frostia bidentata Fender, 1951 i g
 Frostia impressa Fender, 1951 i g
 Frostia laticollis (LeConte, 1866) i g b
 Frostia malkini Fender, 1951 i g
 Frostia reflexa (Fall, 1919) i g
Data sources: i = ITIS, c = Catalogue of Life, g = GBIF, b = Bugguide.net

References

Further reading

 
 

Cantharidae
Articles created by Qbugbot